Andrew Kan Kai-yan is an official in the National Security Division of the Hong Kong Police Force, serving as its director.

National security department 
In December 2021, he was promoted to the directorship of the National Security Division, replacing Frederic Choi.

Sanctions 
On 15 January 2021, Kan was sanctioned by the United States under Executive Order 13936 for his role in implementing the National Security Law.

References

Living people
Hong Kong police officers
Year of birth missing (living people)
Individuals sanctioned by the United States under the Hong Kong Autonomy Act
Specially Designated Nationals and Blocked Persons List